James Day Hodgson (December 3, 1915November 28, 2012) was an American politician. He served as the Secretary of Labor and the Ambassador to Japan.

Life and career

Hodgson was born in Dawson, Minnesota, the son of Fred Arthur Hodgson, a lumberyard owner, and his wife, Casaraha M. (née Day). He graduated from the University of Minnesota in 1938 where he was a member of Phi Sigma Kappa fraternity, and began graduate studies at the University of California at Los Angeles.  He married the former Maria Denend on August 24, 1943. They had two children, Nancy Ruth Hodgson, and Frederick Jesse Hodgson.

During World War II, Hodgson served as an officer in the United States Navy. He worked for Lockheed for 25 years. From 1970 to 1973, Hodgson served as Richard Nixon's Secretary of Labor, and from 1974 to 1977, he served as the U.S. Ambassador to Japan under Gerald Ford.

Beginning in 1977, Hodgson served as the Chairman of the Board of the Uranium Mining Company.  Hodgson served as an adjunct professor at University of California, Los Angeles and was visiting scholar from the American Enterprise Institute.

Following the death of former Labor Secretary W. Willard Wirtz on April 24, 2010, Hodgson became the oldest living former Cabinet member. He died on November 28, 2012, in Malibu, California, and is interred at the Forest Lawn Memorial Park, in Los Angeles, California.

Publications
"American Senryu", The Japan Times, 1992 (a collection of senryū, short humorous poems similar to haiku)
"Doing Business with the New Japan", 2000 (written with Yoshihiro Sano and John L. Graham)

References

External links
 
U.S. Department of Labor Biography
Finding Aid of the James D. Hodgson Papers (California Digital Library)
Price Comparisons Between the Japanese and U.S. Markets (RAND Corporation, 1991)
US Department of State

|-

1915 births
2012 deaths
Ambassadors of the United States to Japan
United States Navy personnel of World War II
Burials at Forest Lawn Memorial Park (Hollywood Hills)
Ford administration personnel
Lockheed people
Nixon administration cabinet members
20th-century American politicians
People from Dawson, Minnesota
RAND Corporation people
United States Navy officers
United States Secretaries of Labor
University of California, Los Angeles alumni
University of California, Los Angeles faculty
University of Minnesota alumni
20th-century American diplomats